Jiuxianqiao Subdistrict is a subdistrict within Chaoyang District, Beijing, China. It borders Chuigezhuang Township to the north and east, Dongfeng Township to the south, Jiangtai Township to the west, Donghu and Wangjing Subdistrict to the northwest. As of 2020, it has a total population of 63,910.

The subdistrict was named after Jiuxianqiao, a bridge within the area. There is a local legend where an alcohol immortal accidentally dropped his liquor under the bridge, and the river started to produce a nice scent ever since.

History

Administrative Division 
As of 2021, the subdistrict has 11 communities under it:

References 

Chaoyang District, Beijing
Subdistricts of Beijing